Rigoberto Trujillo (born December 21, 1978) is a retired judoka from Cuba. He won the bronze medal in the men's heavyweight (+ 100 kg) division at the 2003 Pan American Games, alongside USA's Martin Boonzaayer.

References

1978 births
Living people
Judoka at the 2003 Pan American Games
Cuban male judoka
Pan American Games bronze medalists for Cuba
Pan American Games medalists in judo
Medalists at the 2003 Pan American Games
20th-century Cuban people
21st-century Cuban people